Trevor Basin is a canal basin on the Llangollen Canal, situated near Trevor, Wrexham County Borough, Wales, in between Llangollen and Ruabon.

The basin was originally built at the northern end of the central section of the Ellesmere Canal, just 150yds north of the Pontcysyllte Aqueduct.

With the abandonment of the planned extension to Chester, Trevor Basin became the terminus of the Ellesmere Canal itself.

The canal was later extended westwards, to Llangollen and the Horseshoe Falls, to act as a feeder.

The basin has become a popular tourist destination owing to the adjacent aqueduct, for which is provides several car parks and an additional photo opportunity. A pub, a tea rooms, visitor centre, cafe boat and public toilets now surround the basin.

See also 

Canals of the United Kingdom
History of the British canal system
List of canal basins in the United Kingdom

Canal basins in England and Wales
Llangollen Canal
Ellesmere Canal